The Ngewin or Ngarnka are an indigenous people of Northern Australia.

Ngewin may also refer to:

 Ngawun, an indigenous people of Queensland
 Ngewin language

See also
Alawa people, an indigenous people of Northern Australia